Natalya Tikhonovna Osadcha-Yanata (1891-1982) was a Ukrainian botanist and folklorist noted for studying the medicinal plants of Ukraine and publishing some of her works in English.  She was married to Ukrainian botanist Alexander Yanata.

She worked in the Natural History Museum of the Tavriya Provincial Zemstvo, conducted floristic research in the Simferopol district, and made botanical analyzes of grain contamination. She was an employee of the botanical section of the Crimean Society of Naturalists, conducted practical work on plant anatomy for school teachers.

In 1920, she was in charge of the Korean People's House and its library, and participated in the founding and activities of the Ukrainian circle at the People's House.  In 1921, she returned to Kyiv and continued her work at the Ukrainian Scientific Society as a specialist in the botanical subsection of the natural science section of the Terminology Commission, and when the Society became part of the All-Ukrainian University of Science, she worked at the Institute of the Ukrainian Scientific Language. In 1926-1941, she worked at the Institutes of Applied Botany, Experimental Medicine, and the Ukrainian Chemical and Pharmaceutical Institute.

Works

References 

1891 births
1982 deaths
Ukrainian women biologists
Ukrainian botanists
Women botanists
20th-century Ukrainian women scientists
20th-century botanists
Ukrainian folklorists
Women folklorists